Annamocalamus is a genus of flowering plants belonging to the family Poaceae.

Its native range is Indo-China.

Species:

Annamocalamus kontumensis

References

Poaceae
Poaceae genera